

Kevin Connelly is an impressionist, comedian, and after dinner speaker who is probably best known for his role on the popular BBC radio and television programme Dead Ringers.

Connelly was born in Middlesbrough, England and was educated at St Mary's Roman Catholic College in Middlesbrough, where he would mimic his fellow students and teachers.  Later while working in the Cleveland Tontine restaurant business, he would entertain his customers with unrehearsed cameo pieces.  This led directly to engagements as an after-dinner speaker.

Connelly lives in North Yorkshire, where he spends much of his time travelling to London to work at the BBC on Dead Ringers.  The remainder of his time is spent delivering after-dinner speeches using his talent for impersonation, principally of sports personalities.

Appearances 

Dead Ringers - BBC 2002
The Impressionable Jon Culshaw - ITV 2004
Today with Des and Mel
BBC Sports Review of the Year
Des O'Connors World Cup Party
The Full Motty - BBC 1998
We're On Our Way To Wembley
The Sports Show
It's Just Not Cricket, With Rory Bremner
Saint & Greavsie
The Pavilion End
Doubletake

Notable impressions 
David Dimbleby
Mark Lawson
Andrew Marr
Andrew Neil

References

External links
Kevin Connelly on BBC Comedy Guide

About Kevin Connelly

English male comedians
English impressionists (entertainers)
English satirists
English people of Irish descent
Living people
People from Middlesbrough
Year of birth missing (living people)
20th-century English comedians
21st-century English comedians